Melka may refer to:
Melka (surname)
Melka Kunture,  a Paleolithic site in Ethiopia
Melka Suftu, a town in Ethiopia
Melka Wakena Hydroelectric Power Station, Ethiopia

See also
Malka (disambiguation)